West Mountain is a ski area located in Queensbury, New York, just outside the Adirondack Park on West Mountain Road (CR58). In the summer and fall, West Mountain offers Aerial Tree Top Adventure Tours, Mountain Biking (downhill and cross-country), scenic chairlift rides and hikes, full-service dining (limited hours) with dinner and date night packages and available for wedding and special event bookings.
In the winter, West Mountain contains 30 ski trails ranging in difficulty from easy green trails to more advanced black diamond trails and some glades. There is also a tubing park near the Main Lodge, containing six 700-foot chutes and four 1000-foot chutes. West Mountain has 100% snowmaking and has replaced all its old chairlifts with newer quad and triple chairlifts. The main lodge contains a cafe on the first floor and a full-service restaurant and bar on the second floor called the "West Mountain Bar & Eatery". West Mountain and the surrounding area is located within the Adirondack Mountains.

Statistics 

 Base: 
 Summit: 
 Vertical drop: 
 Skiable area: 
 Number of Trails: 31, beginner 20% intermediate 65% advanced 25%

Lifts

References

External links
West Mountain website
SnoCountry.com West Mountain Snow Report

Ski areas and resorts in New York (state)
Queensbury, New York
Sports venues in Warren County, New York